Mutts to You is a 1938 short subject directed by Charley Chase starring American slapstick comedy team The Three Stooges (Moe Howard, Larry Fine and Curly Howard). It is the 34th entry in the series released by Columbia Pictures starring the comedians, who released 190 shorts for the studio between 1934 and 1959.

Plot
The Stooges operate a successful dog grooming business featuring a conveyor belt contrivance and a water wheel that requires Curly to pedal a stationary bicycle in order to keep water flowing. Among the Stooges' clients is an affluent couple named Manning (Bess Flowers and Lane Chandler), who have an elaborate misunderstanding that leads to their baby being left momentarily on the Mannings' front doorstep just as the Stooges pass by on their way home from work. Thinking the infant has been abandoned, the trio take the child back to their apartment house, despite the firm rule of no babies or dogs being allowed on the premises.

When the Stooges see the afternoon newspaper saying the baby was kidnapped, they attempt to return the infant to his parents. Moe and Larry disguise Curly as the baby's mother, dubbing him "Mrs. O'Toole." Unfortunately, an Irish Policeman named O'Halloran (Bud Jamison) strikes up a conversation with the "Irish mother", concludes that they are the kidnappers, and tries to apprehend them. The boys make a run for it and are chased by O'Halloran, Moe and Larry pulling Curly and the baby in a laundry cart. 

After being caught, the Mannings reunite, explain the misunderstanding, and the Stooges are free to go. After Mrs. Manning exclaims how filthy the baby is, the Stooges put him through the dog washing machine, but Curly accidentally messes up the controls, resulting in the machine slapping the baby's bottom. The episode ends with the Stooges trying to stop the machine.

Production notes
Filming for Mutts to You took place from March 30 to April 2, 1938. The film title is a pun on the insult "Nuts to you!" The Stooges also played babysitters of sorts in Sock-a-Bye Baby, Three Loan Wolves, and Baby Sitters Jitters.

When Officer O'Halloran notices Moe and Larry disguised as Chinese laundrymen he stops them and begins asking questions. Moe responds with some mock Chinese while Larry responds with a mixture of Yiddish and English: "Ikh bin ah China boychik fun Slobodka un Ikh bet dir 'hak mir nit ah chaynik' and I don't mean efsher". The phrase is Yiddish for "I am a Chinese kid from Slobodka and I beg you don't bother me and I don't mean maybe." Moe follows this with, "He from China, East Side," a reference to the Lower East Side of Manhattan, which was predominantly Jewish at the time.

References

External links 
 
 

1938 films
1938 comedy films
The Three Stooges films
American black-and-white films
Films directed by Charley Chase
Columbia Pictures short films
American slapstick comedy films
1930s English-language films
1930s American films